Long intergenic non-protein coding RNA 900 is a Non-coding RNA that in humans is encoded by the LINC00900 gene.

References